The painting which inspired this piece of music is also sometimes called the Sposalizio; for it, see Sposalizio (painting).

Sposalizio is the title of the first piece in Franz Liszt's Deuxième Année de Pèlerinage: Italie (Second Year of Pilgrimage: Italy), published in 1858. The composition starts out with a simple pentatonic melody, which transforms itself into a complex musical architecture. The melody then transforms itself into a type of wedding march, which continually embellishes itself to lead up to the grand climax, which contains crashing octaves into a loud finish. The composition ends quietly.

Franz Liszt composed Sposalizio, which translates into "Marriage", from Italian, after being inspired from Raphael's painting The Marriage of the Virgin. This was quite common for much of the works contained in his Années de Pèlerinage.

Although the fast octaves can be somewhat challenging, the piece departs from the virtuosic fireworks that were trademarks of some of his earlier works.

The term sposalitzio appeared in the "Most Happy Fella" a show by Frank Loesser that appeared on Broadway in the 1950s. The song in which it appeared was entitled "Great Big Italian Sposalitzio."

External links 
 

Compositions by Franz Liszt
Compositions for solo piano
1858 compositions